Second Partition may refer to:
Second Partition of Poland, 1793
Second Partition of Luxembourg, 1795